Abraham Orlando Núñez Adames [NOO-nyez] (born March 16, 1976) is a Dominican former professional baseball third baseman. He played in Major League Baseball (MLB) from 1997 to 2008 for the Pittsburgh Pirates, St. Louis Cardinals, Philadelphia Phillies, and New York Mets. Núñez primarily played third base, but was capable of playing all four infield positions.

Career
He played 630 games with the Pittsburgh Pirates from -. After the 2005 season, he signed with the Philadelphia Phillies as a free agent. While he was with the Phillies, Nunez was used in roles as a defensive replacement and as a starter when pitcher Jamie Moyer was on the mound. Nunez is known for his sharp fielding skills, and was apparently a better fielder than the Phillies Greg Dobbs and Wes Helms who, as a Philly sportswriter said, "fields with oven mitts".

Brewers and Bears

At the end of the 2007 season, Núñez was released by the Phillies. At the start of 2008, he signed a minor league contract with the Milwaukee Brewers, but was later released, and during May he signed on with the New York Mets. The Mets designated him for assignment on June 11 and he became a free agent at the end of the season.

On May 11, 2009, Nunez agreed to play for the Newark Bears of the Atlantic League. Later that month, the Arizona Diamondbacks signed him to a minor league contract.

The Jackals

On March 5, 2010, Nunez signed a contract to play for the New Jersey Jackals of the independent Canadian-American (Can-Am) League.

Coaching Résumé

Nunez began his coaching tenure within the Kansas City Royals organization in 2012 as the hitting coach for the DSL Royals of the Dominican Summer League. Since then he has served in the same capacity for the Rookie Level Burlington Royals (2013), Low-A Lexington Legends (2014), and Advanced-A Wilmington Blue Rocks (2015-19). As of 2022, Nunez is the hitting coach of the Royals' Double-A team, the Northwest Arkansas Naturals. 

Nunez has also given his time in the off-season to serve as the bench coach for the Dominican Winter League Gigantes del Cibao; there he was part of the National Championship-winning team in 2015.

External links

1976 births
Living people
Carolina Mudcats players
Dominican Republic expatriate baseball players in the United States

Leones del Escogido players
Lynchburg Hillcats players
Major League Baseball players from the Dominican Republic
Major League Baseball third basemen
Minor league baseball coaches
Nashville Sounds players
New Jersey Jackals players
New Orleans Zephyrs players
New York Mets players
Newark Bears players
Philadelphia Phillies players
Pittsburgh Pirates players
Reno Aces players
St. Catharines Stompers players
St. Louis Cardinals players
Worcester Tornadoes players